The 1979 Grambling State Tigers football team represented Grambling State University as a member of the Southwestern Athletic Conference (SWAC) during the 1979 NCAA Division I-AA football season. Led by 37th-year head coach Eddie Robinson, the Tigers compiled an overall record of 8–3 and a mark of 5–1 in conference play, and finished as SWAC co-champion.

Schedule

References

Grambling State
Grambling State Tigers football seasons
Southwestern Athletic Conference football champion seasons
Grambling State Tigers football